Milan Strelec (born 30 November 1972) is a retired Slovak football striker who currently plays for FC Petržalka akadémia in 5. liga (Bratislava).

Personal life
His son, named David Strelec, is also footballer. He represents Slovakia at the U21 level and  plays for Slovan Bratislava.

External links
Futbalnet profile

References

1972 births
Living people
Slovak footballers
Slovak expatriate footballers
Association football forwards
ŠK Slovan Bratislava players
FC Petržalka players
FC DAC 1904 Dunajská Streda players
LP Domino players
MŠK - Thermál Veľký Meder players
Fortuna Düsseldorf players
Public Bank F.C. players
Slovak Super Liga players
Slovak expatriate sportspeople in Malaysia
Expatriate footballers in Malaysia
Slovak expatriate sportspeople in Germany
Expatriate footballers in Germany
Footballers from Bratislava